Jane Weir or Jean Weir (died 1670), was a Scottish woman executed for witchcraft. 
She was the sister of Major Thomas Weir who was charged with incest and witchcraft in 1670 and was subsequently executed.

Weir was born near Carluke in Lanarkshire. Her brother Thomas Weir was a strict Protestant whose spoken prayers earned him a reputation that attracted visitors to his home in Edinburgh.

Following his retirement in 1670, Weir fell ill and began to confess to a secret life of crime and vice. The Lord Provost initially found the confession implausible and took no action, but eventually Weir and his spinster sister, Jane Weir, were taken to the Edinburgh Tolbooth for interrogation. Major Weir, now in his seventies, continued to expand on his confession and Jane Weir gave an even more exaggerated history of witchcraft, sorcery and vice.

The trial began on 9 April 1670. Jane Weir confessed that their mother had been a witch and had taught her children. She also revealed that Thomas bore the mark of the Beast on his body and that they frequently roamed the countryside in a fiery coach.

References

People executed for witchcraft
17th-century Scottish women
1670 births
17th-century executions by Scotland
Witch trials in Scotland
1670 deaths